Datuk Seri Mohd Redzuan bin Md Yusof (Jawi: محمد رضوان بن مد يوسف) is a Malaysian politician who served as Minister in the Prime Minister's Department for Special Functions in the Perikatan Nasional (PN) administration under former Prime Minister Muhyiddin Yassin from March 2020 to August 2021, the Minister of Entrepreneur Development in the Pakatan Harapan (PH) administration under former prime minister Mahathir Mohamad from July 2018 to the collapse of the PH administration in February 2020 and the Member of Parliament (MP) for Alor Gajah from May 2018 to November 2022. He is a member of the Malaysian United Indigenous Party (BERSATU), a component party of the  PN coalition and formerly PH coalition.

Early life and education 
Mohd Redzuan was born in Masjid Tanah, Malacca, Federation of Malaya (now Malaysia). He graduated with Bachelor of Civil Engineering from University of Leeds.

Early career 
Mohd Redzuan worked for an American company based in Malaysia for eight years. He joined Petronas in 1999 and worked there for three years. After that, he started his own business.

Political career 
Mohd Redzuan contested and succeeded in winning the Alor Gajah parliamentary seat as a BERSATU candidate in the 2018 general election. Following this, he was appointed as the Minister of Entrepreneur Development in the seventh Mahathir Mohamed's cabinet on 2 July 2018 in the presence of the Yang di Pertuan Agong. After political crisis took place in 2020, he was appointed back as Minister in the Prime Minister's Department for Special Functions in Muhyiddin cabinet.

Personal life
Mohd Redzuan was married with two women (with Hamidah Osman in 1981 and with Nurshid'la Ahmad Kamaruddin in 2011) and blessed with 4 children.

Election results

Honours

Honours of Malaysia
  :
  Grand Commander of the Exalted Order of Malacca (DGSM) – Datuk Seri (2018)

References

External links
 

1957 births
Living people
People from Malacca
Malaysian people of Malay descent
Malaysian Muslims
Malaysian United Indigenous Party politicians
Members of the Dewan Rakyat
Government ministers of Malaysia
Alumni of the University of Leeds
21st-century Malaysian politicians